Cadmium chloride is a white crystalline compound of cadmium and chloride, with the formula CdCl2. This salt is a hygroscopic solid that is highly soluble in water and slightly soluble in alcohol. The crystal structure of cadmium chloride (described below), is a reference for describing other crystal structures. Also known are CdCl2•H2O and CdCl2•5H2O.

Structure
Cadmium chloride forms a layered structure consisting of octahedral Cd2+ centers linked with chloride ligands. Cadmium iodide, CdI2, has a similar structure, but the iodide ions are arranged in a HCP lattice, whereas in CdCl2 the chloride ions are arranged in a CCP lattice.

Chemical properties
Cadmium chloride dissolves well in water and other polar solvents. It is a mild Lewis acid.
CdCl2 + 2 Cl− → [CdCl4]2− 
Solutions of equimolar cadmium chloride and potassium chloride give potassium cadmium trichloride.
With large cations, it is possible to isolate the trigonal bipyramidal [CdCl5]3− ion.

Preparation
Anhydrous cadmium chloride can be prepared by the reaction of hydrochloric acid and cadmium metal. 
 Cd + 2 HCl → CdCl2 + H2
The anhydrous salt can also be prepared from anhydrous cadmium acetate using hydrogen chloride or acetyl chloride.

Uses
Cadmium chloride is used for the preparation of cadmium sulfide, used as "cadmium yellow", a brilliant-yellow stable inorganic pigment.
 +  →  + 2 HCl

In the laboratory, anhydrous CdCl2 can be used for the preparation of organocadmium compounds of the type R2Cd, where R is an aryl or a primary alkyl. These were once used in the synthesis of ketones from acyl chlorides:

  + 2 RMgX →  +  + 

 + 2R'COCl → 2R'COR + 
Such reagents have largely been supplanted by organocopper compounds, which are much less toxic.

Cadmium chloride is also used for photocopying, dyeing and electroplating.

Like all cadmium compounds,  is highly toxic and appropriate safety precautions must be taken when handling it.

References

External links
International Chemical Safety Card 0116
IARC Monograph "Cadmium and Cadmium Compounds"
 National Pollutant Inventory - Cadmium and compounds

Cadmium compounds
Chlorides
Metal halides
IARC Group 1 carcinogens